Shen Weixiao (born May 1975 in Guichi, Anhui, China) is a Chinese mathematician, specializing in dynamical systems (in particular, real and complex one-dimensional dynamics).

Shen graduated from the University of Science and Technology of China in 1995. He received his Ph.D. from the University of Tokyo in 2001 with thesis On the metric property of multimodal interval maps and density of axiom A under the supervision of Mitsuhiro Shishikura. Shen was previously a professor at the National University of Singapore. He is currently a professor at Fudan University.

He published, with Oleg Kozlovski and Sebastian van Strien, a solution of the 2nd part of the 11th problem of Smale's problems.

In 2009 Shen was one of the two winners of the Chern Award of the Chinese Mathematical Society. In 2014 Shen was an invited speaker, with Sebastian van Strien, at the International Congress of Mathematicians in Seoul.

Selected publications

 (See Axiom A.)

References

1975 births
Living people
20th-century Chinese mathematicians
21st-century Chinese mathematicians
University of Science and Technology of China alumni
University of Tokyo alumni
Academic staff of the National University of Singapore
Educators from Anhui
People from Chizhou
Mathematicians from Anhui
Chinese expatriates in Singapore
Academic staff of the University of Science and Technology of China